Sushil Kumar Rinku (born 5 June 1975) is an Indian politician and a member of Indian National Congress. In 2017, he was elected as the member of the Punjab Legislative Assembly from Jalandhar West.

Constituency
He won the Jalandhar West on an INC ticket, he beat the member of the Punjab Legislative Assembly Mahinder Pal Bhagat of the BJP by over 17334 votes.

References

Living people
Indian politicians
Punjab, India MLAs 2017–2022
1975 births
Indian National Congress politicians
People from Punjab, India
Indian National Congress politicians from Punjab, India